Thedden Grange is a privately owned country house and estate in the civil parish of Bentworth, on the outskirts of Alton, Hampshire, England.  Since renovation in the mid-1970s the original house, outbuildings and land have been divided into seven separate properties plus additional flats.

The house and grounds have been used as locations in a number of films and television programmes. The estate covers 40 acres of land, among which are 9 acres of ornamental garden.

History 
Thedden has a long history going back to at least the 15th century, when it is recorded that William Estone paid rent for lands at the manor. In the 19th century Thedden Grange was owned by industrialist John Wood. During the Second World War the house was used as a prisoner of war camp (number 294).

References

External links 
Flickr Thedden Grange Photo Group
Independent interview with Thedden residents, from 16 June 1996
Richard Miller Ceramics visit Thedden
Gazetteer entry for Alton from 1870 with mention of Thedden Grange

Country houses in Hampshire